Tyukalinsky District is an administrative and municipal district (raion), one of the thirty-two in Omsk Oblast, Russia. It is located in the western central part of the oblast. Its administrative center is the town of Tyukalinsk (which is not administratively a part of the district). Population: 14,831 (2010 Census);

Administrative and municipal status
Within the framework of administrative divisions, Tyukalinsky District is one of the thirty-two in the oblast. The town of Tyukalinsk serves as its administrative center, despite being incorporated separately as a town of oblast significance—an administrative unit with the status equal to that of the districts.

As a municipal division, the district is incorporated as Tyukalinsky Municipal District, with the town of oblast significance of Tyukalinsk being incorporated within it as Tyukalinsk Urban Settlement.

References

Notes

Sources

Districts of Omsk Oblast

